17119 Alexisrodrz, provisional designation , is a stony background asteroid from the central region of the asteroid belt, approximately 4 kilometers in diameter.

It was discovered on 10 May 1999, by the LINEAR team at the Lincoln Laboratory's Experimental Test Site in Socorro, New Mexico, United States. The asteroid was later named for Alexis Rodriguez, a 2003-awardee of the Intel International Science and Engineering Fair.

Orbit and classification 

Alexisrodrz orbits the Sun in the central main-belt at a distance of 2.5–2.8 AU once every 4 years and 3 months (1,565 days). Its orbit has an eccentricity of 0.06 and an inclination of 6° with respect to the ecliptic.

The asteroid's observation arc begins 7 years prior to its official discovery observation, with a precovery taken at Steward Observatory (Kitt Peak) in November 1992.

Physical characteristics 

Alexisrodrz has been characterized as a LS-subtype by Pan-STARRS large-scale survey. This subtype is a transitional group from the common stony S-type to the rare and reddish L-type asteroids.

Diameter and albedo 

According to the survey carried out by the NEOWISE mission of NASA's space-based Wide-field Infrared Survey Explorer, Alexisrodrz measures 3.9 kilometers in diameter and its surface has an albedo of 0.18, while the Collaborative Asteroid Lightcurve Link assumes an albedo of 0.10 – a compromise value between the stony (0.20) and carbonaceous (0.057) asteroids found in the 2.6 to 2.7 AU region of the asteroid belt – and calculates a diameter of 4.6 kilometers with an absolute magnitude of 14.82.

Rotation period 

In January 2011, and September 2013, two rotational lightcurves of Alexisrodrz were obtained from photometric observations made by astronomers at the Palomar Transient Factory in California.

Naming 

This minor planet was named for the 3rd-place winner of the 2003 Intel International Science and Engineering Fair, Alexis Rodriguez (born 1986). At the time, he attended the Puerto Rican Aurea E. Quiles Claudio High School in Guanica. The approved naming citation was published by the Minor Planet Center on 14 June 2004.

References

External links 
 Asteroid Lightcurve Database (LCDB), query form (info )
 Dictionary of Minor Planet Names, Google books
 Asteroids and comets rotation curves, CdR – Observatoire de Genève, Raoul Behrend
 Discovery Circumstances: Numbered Minor Planets (15001)-(20000) – Minor Planet Center
 
 

017119
017119
Named minor planets
19990510